Attack of the Killer B-Sides is the third EP by American rock band A Day to Remember. It was released on May 25, 2010, through Victory. First vinyl releases of the EP were on clear white smoke (200 copies), toxic green (1300 copies), and pink vinyl (500 copies), the latter being a Hot Topic exclusive release. Pre-orders were taken a couple of weeks before on May 17.

Content
The EP features 4 songs, all recorded at The Wade Studios by Andrew Wade in Ocala, Florida and were previously released in some form by the band, though not on an album:
 "Right Where You Want Me to Be" was released as a special stand-alone holiday single for Christmas in 2009.
 "Since U Been Gone" was released on the 2008 re-release of For Those Who Have Heart (2007).
 "Another Song About the Weekend" (Acoustic) was released on the special edition of Homesick (2009).
 "Over My Head (Cable Car)" was released on the Punk Goes Pop 2 (2009) compilation.

Reissues
The EP, along with For Those Who Have Heart and Homesick, had a reissue on vinyl, in 2011. Another vinyl reissue was released, on August 13, 2013, in 3 different colors.

Reception
Thrash Hits reviewer Tom Doyle said that the first track, "Right Where You Want Me to Be", started "things off in pleasant enough fashion" with "its bouncing, super-infectious chorus". Doyle called the band's cover of Kelly Clarkson's "Since U Been Gone" "a pretty sedate plod through a song which wasn’t really that good to begin with", and that their cover of The Fray's "Over My Head (Cable Car)" suited better to the band's style.

Track list
All songs written by A Day to Remember, unless noted.

Personnel
Personnel per Attack of the Killer B-Sides sleeve.

A Day to Remember
Josh Woodard – bass
Alex Shelnutt – drums
Neil Westfall – rhythm guitar
Jeremy McKinnon – vocals
Kevin Skaff – lead guitar

Additional musician
Tom Denney – lead guitar (tracks 2–4)

Production
Andrew Wade – producer
Mike C. Harcdore – cover illustration
Doublej – layout
Adam Elmakias – band photo

References
 Footnotes

 Citations

External links

Attack of the Killer B-Sides at YouTube (streamed copy where licensed)

A Day to Remember EPs
Victory Records EPs
2010 EPs